Ellsworth Township is one of twelve townships in Emmet County, Iowa, USA.  As of the 2020 census, its population was 93.

Geography
According to the United States Census Bureau, Ellsworth Township covers an area of 29.06 square miles (75.27 square kilometers).

Unincorporated towns
 Huntington at 
(This list is based on USGS data and may include former settlements.)

Adjacent townships
 Lincoln Township (east)
 Swan Lake Township (southeast)
 Center Township (south)
 Estherville Township (southwest)
 Emmet Township (west)

Cemeteries
The township contains these two cemeteries: Ellsworth and Prosser.

Major highways
  Iowa Highway 4

School districts
 Estherville Lincoln Central Community School District

Political districts
 Iowa's 4th congressional district
 State House District 7
 State Senate District 4

References
 United States Census Bureau 2008 TIGER/Line Shapefiles
 United States Board on Geographic Names (GNIS)
 United States National Atlas

External links
 US-Counties.com
 City-Data.com

Townships in Emmet County, Iowa
Townships in Iowa